CW 6 may refer to:

In television

Current affiliates
KASW, a TV channel licensed to Phoenix, Arizona, USA
WSTQ-LP, a TV channel licensed to Syracuse, New York, USA
WXCW, a TV channel licensed to Naples, Florida, USA
KECY-DT3, a digital subchannel licensed to Yuma, Arizona, USA

Former affiliates
XETV-TDT, a TV channel licensed to Tijuana, Baja California, Mexico formerly known as CW6 (2008 to 2017)

In aircraft
Cessna CW-6, a 1920s American six-seat touring aircraft
Curtiss-Wright CW-6, a late 1920s American six-seat utility aircraft

In other uses
CW6, a postcode district in the CW postcode area in Cheshire, England